The 2008–09 Chinese economic stimulus plan is a RMB¥ 4 trillion (US$586 billion) stimulus package announced by the State Council of the People's Republic of China on 9 November 2008 as an attempt to minimize the impact of the financial crisis of 2007–2008 on the economy of China. Critics of China's stimulus package have blamed it for causing a surge in Chinese debt since 2009, particularly among local governments and state-owned enterprises.

The economic stimulus plan was seen as a success and while China's economic growth dipped sharply to almost 6% during 4Q 2008 and 1Q 2009 it had recovered to over 8% in Q2 2009 and over 10% in Q3 2009. The World Bank subsequently went on to recommend similar public works spending campaigns to western governments experiencing the effects of the financial crisis but the U.S. and EU instead decided to pursue long-term policies of quantitative easing (the buying of trillions of dollars worth of government bonds or other financial assets in order to stimulate the economy and increase liquidity).

Announcement
A statement on the government's website said the State Council of the People's Republic of China had approved a plan to invest 4 trillion yuan in infrastructure and social welfare by the end of 2010. This stimulus, equivalent to US$586 billion, represented a pledge comparable to that subsequently announced by the United States, but which came from an economy only one third the size. The stimulus package will be invested in key areas such as housing, rural infrastructure, transportation, health and education, environment, industry, disaster rebuilding, income-building, tax cuts, and finance.

China's export driven economy started to feel the impact of the economic slowdown in the United States and Europe, and the government had already cut key interest rates three times in less than two months in a bid to spur economic expansion.

The stimulus package was welcomed by world leaders and analysts as larger than expected and a sign that by boosting its own economy, China is helping to stabilize the world economy. World Bank President Robert Zoellick declared that he was 'delighted' and believed that China was 'well positioned given its current account surplus and budget position to have fiscal expansion.' News of the announcement of the stimulus package sent markets up across the world.

Details

2008
On the 15 of November, 2008, it was revealed that the central government would only provide 1.2 trillion yuan of funds. The rest of the funds will be reallocated from the budget of provincial and local governments.

Chinese banking officials were reportedly considering establishing a fund worth between 600 billion and 800 billion yuan to purchase domestic shares listed on the Shanghai Stock Exchange, particularly those in the Shanghai Composite, in the event the Shanghai Index fell to 1,500 points.

2009
On March 6, 2009, China's National Development and Reform Commission' announced a revision of the stimulus and published a breakdown of how the funds would be distributed.

Public infrastructure development took up the biggest portion – 1.5 trillion yuan, or nearly 38% of the total package. The projects lined up include railway, road, irrigation, and airport construction.

The second largest allocation – one trillion yuan – went to reconstruction works in regions hit by the 8-magnitude Sichuan earthquake in May 2008; that was followed by funding for social welfare plans, including the construction of low-cost housing, rehabilitation of slums, and other social safety net projects.

Rural development and technology advancement programs shared the same amount of allocation – at 370 billion yuan each. Rural projects in the pipeline included building public amenities, resettling nomads, supporting agriculture works, and providing safe drinking water.

Technology advancement mainly targeted at upgrading the Chinese industrial sector, gearing towards high-end production to move away from the current export-oriented and labor-intensive mode of growth. This was in line with the government's latest blueprint for revitalizing 10 selected industries.

To ensure sustainable development, the Chinese government also allocated some 210 billion yuan, or 5.3% of the stimulus package for promoting energy saving and gas emission cuts, and environmental engineering projects.

Finally, 150 billion yuan was allocated for educational, cultural and family planning purposes.

One year later, these programs seem to have been even more successful than expected, so that on November 4, 2009, the World Bank group enhanced its "prognosis" of the Chinese GDP, by +1.2%, to a value of +8.4%.

2010
China's economic growth was sustained by the economic stimulus and in addition, assisted neighboring countries with the economic recovery in 2010. Chinese real economic growth was around 10 percent even as European and North American economies were slowing. The stimulus provided funds for infrastructure projects and housing developments. Some were used to assist local governments in lending to state-owned enterprises for housing and infrastructure projects. This focus on construction expanded employment in not only construction, but also manufacturing, steel, cement and other sectors producing inputs to the construction sector. Some analysts suggested that the stimulus program could generate inflation and a property bubble.

Due to the success of the economic stimulus plan, the central government tightened financial regulation in order to restrict lending amid fears of a property bubble.

2011
In 2011, it was revealed that as much as 20% of the loans under the program may be written off.

2012
In September 2012, the Chinese government through the  National Development and Reform Commission gave approval for 60 infrastructure projects totalling more than 1 trillion yuan ($157 billion).

Responses
The stimulus package has been criticized for causing a surge in Chinese debt after 2009. In 2011, Minxin Pei criticized Beijing for "resorting to massive bank lending to local governments, which then went on an infrastructure spending binge that's certain to haunt the country for years to come". A 2014 study by global think-tank Carnegie Endowment for International Peace concluded that "[China]'s debt problems are rooted in the government's November 2008 announcement of a 4 trillion yuan ($586 billion) stimulus package to counteract the effects of the global financial crisis."

See also

2000s energy crisis
2007–2008 world food price crisis
2008–2012 Icelandic financial crisis
2008–2009 Russian financial crisis
Bear Stearns subprime mortgage hedge fund crisis
Collateralized debt obligation
Credit derivative
Derivative (finance)
Financial crisis of 2007–2010
Global financial crisis of 2008–2009
Late-2000s recession
List of entities involved in 2007–2008 financial crises
Margin call
Mark-to-market accounting
Savings and loan crisis
Statistical Arbitrage: Events of Summer 2007
Subprime crisis impact timeline
Subprime mortgage crisis
United States housing market correction

References

External links

 FACTBOX - China's recent measures to spur growth (timeline)

Economic stimulus program
2000s economic history
Stimulus program
Economic stimulus programs
Economic development programs